Daniel L. Meyer (born January 1, 1949) is a retired American businessman and Republican politician from Wisconsin.  He was secretary of the Wisconsin Department of Natural Resources (2017–2018) in the cabinet of governor Scott Walker.  He previously served 14 years (1999–2012) in the Wisconsin State Assembly, representing the 34th Assembly district (northern Wisconsin), and was mayor of Eagle River, Wisconsin (1997–2001).

Biography

Born in Neenah, Wisconsin, Meyer graduated from Neenah High School and the University of Wisconsin–Oshkosh; and served in the United States Army during the Vietnam War era. Meyer was the director of the Eagle River, Wisconsin, chamber of commerce and was mayor of Eagle River from 1997 to 2001. He served in the Wisconsin State Assembly from 1999 until his retirement from the legislature in 2013. During his time in the legislature, Meyer was a member of the Natural Resources committee, Veterans and Military Affairs committee and the Joint Committee on Finance.

References

1949 births
Living people
State cabinet secretaries of Wisconsin
Businesspeople from Wisconsin
Mayors of places in Wisconsin
Republican Party members of the Wisconsin State Assembly
Military personnel from Wisconsin
Politicians from Neenah, Wisconsin
People from Eagle River, Wisconsin
University of Wisconsin–Oshkosh alumni
United States Army soldiers
21st-century American politicians